The Cabinet of Bahrain is the chief executive body of the Kingdom of Bahrain. According to Article 32 (b) of the 2002 Constitution, "executive authority is vested in the King together with the Council of Ministers and Ministers". The Council of Ministers (Cabinet) is appointed directly by the King (Article 33d).

Bahrain has had only two Prime Ministers since the country's independence in 1971, Khalifah ibn Sulman al-Khalifah, the uncle of the reigning King Hamad ibn Isa al-Khalifah. Khalifah ibn Sulman al-Khalifah died on 11 November 2020, and was succeeded by the King's son, Crown Prince Salman. As of 2010, roughly half of the cabinet ministers have been selected from the Al Khalifa family, including the Minister of Defence, Minister of Interior, Minister of Foreign Affairs, Minister of Finance, and Minister of Justice and Islamic Affairs.

In February 2011, four ministers were dropped, two added and some portfolios shifted:
The ministers dropped in the cabinet reshuffle included Minister of Health Faisal al-Hamar, Minister of Housing Shaikh Ibrahim bin Khalifa Al Khalifa, Minister of Electricity and Water Fahmi Al Jowder, and Minister of State for Cabinet Affairs Shaikh Ahmed bin Attiyatallah Al Khalifa. The Ministry of Housing was given to current Labour Minister, Majeed Al Alwai, while the Ministry of Labour was given to Undersecretary of Labour Jameel Humadan. The Ministry of Health was given to current Minister of State for Foreign Affairs Nazar Al Baharna. Executive Chairman of Operation at the Bahrain Development Board Kamal Ahmed was given the post of Minister of State for Cabinet Affairs. The Ministry of Oil and Gas joined the Electricity and Water Authority and was named the Ministry of Energy under Minister of Oil and Gas Abdulhussain bin Ali Mirza.

In March 2013, Crown Prince Salman was appointed first deputy prime minister.

In December 2014, a cabinet reshuffle was made for the fourth legislative term. This reshuffle saw the removal of Ministers of State, the removal of the Ministry of Culture, also 11 previous ministers were removed from their posts and 4 new ministers were added. Some portfolio changes were made as well.

In March  and June 2016, minor reshuffling was made again. The Ministry of Information Affairs and Shura Council and House of Representative Affairs was split into two separate Ministries, viz., the Ministry of Information Affairs and the Ministry of Parliament Affairs, and the Ministry of Energy was split into two separate Ministries, viz., the Ministry of Electricity and Water Affairs and the Ministry of Oil respectively.

In June 2022, a major reshuffling was made.

Cabinet members
The current Cabinet was appointed on 21 November 2022

Previous Cabinet

References

External links
Cabinet, Kingdom of Bahrain

Bahrain, Cabinet
Government of Bahrain